Clout was, originally, an all-female South African rock group formed in Johannesburg in 1977, best known for their hit single, "Substitute". Later in their career, the group included some male musicians, who had played as session musicians on the recording.

Career
Clout's first and biggest hit, "Substitute", was a new arrangement of a Righteous Brothers song, composed by Willie Wilson. In 1978, their version reached No. 1 in South Africa, New Zealand, Germany, France, The Netherlands, Sweden, Austria, Denmark and Belgium. It also reached No. 2 on the UK Singles Chart and remained in the UK charts for 15 weeks. Due to sanctions against South African artists and performers by UK's Equity at the time, the BBC One television series Top of the Pops used the group's performance of the song on Dutch programme TopPop, from 8 April 1978, to present the hit song for its Top 10 countdown.

A major success in Europe, Clout scored more Top 10 singles, notably "Save Me", "You've Got All of Me" and "Under Fire".

Clout's cover of  "Substitute" reached No. 67 on the U.S. Billboard Hot 100.

Clout split up in 1981, shortly after the release of their last major single, a re-arrangement of the Hall and Oates song "Portable Radio". The previous single "Oowatanite" was also a cover, the original being a hit by the Canadian group April Wine. 

In 1992, their greatest hits package was released on CD, and it was re-mastered as The Best of Clout in 2010.

Musicians
Cindy Alter: born in Johannesburg , South Africa  lead vocals, guitar (1977–1981)
Ilene "Lee" Tomlinson: bass, vocals (1977–1980)
Ingrid "Ingi" Herbst: drums, vocals (1977–1981)
Glenda Hyam: keyboards, vocals (1977)
Jenni Garson: guitar, vocals (1977–1981)
Ron "Bones" Brettell: keyboards, vocals (1978–1981)
Sandy Robbie: guitar, vocals (1978–1981)
Gary van Zyl: bass (1980–1981)

Discography

Albums
1978: Substitute (aka Clout)
1979: Six of the Best
1980: A Threat and a Promise
1981: 1977 to 1981 (compilation with one new song)
1992: Substitute (Dutch compilation)
1992: 20 Greatest Hits (compilation)
1994: Clout (German compilation)
2007: Since We've Been Gone (compilation with nine new recordings)
2010: The Best of Clout (compilation)

Singles

References

External links
Clout

All-female bands
Musical quintets
South African rock music groups
Carrere Records artists
Female-fronted musical groups